Golden Prairie is a village in the Canadian province of Saskatchewan within the Rural Municipality of Big Stick No. 141 and Census Division No. 8.

History 
Golden Prairie incorporated as a village on April 15, 1942.

Demographics 

Economy
The village has a grain elevator with producer car loading facility, curling rink and restaurant. It holds the seat to the Rural Municipality of Big Stick No. 141 office.

Climate
Golden Prairie experiences a semi-arid climate (Köppen climate classification BSk) with long, cold, dry winters and short but very warm summers.

See also
 List of communities in Saskatchewan
 Villages of Saskatchewan

References

Villages in Saskatchewan
Big Stick No. 141, Saskatchewan
Division No. 8, Saskatchewan
1942 establishments in Saskatchewan
Populated places established in 1911